Darshana Mahawatte (born 20 September 1990) is a Sri Lankan cricketer. He made his first-class debut for Kurunegala Youth Cricket Club in Tier B of the 2011–12 Premier League Tournament on 7 February 2012.

References

External links
 

1990 births
Living people
Sri Lankan cricketers
Kurunegala Youth Cricket Club cricketers
Place of birth missing (living people)